Zazdravnykh is a surname. Notable people with the surname include:

 Valentina Zazdravnykh (born 1954), Soviet field hockey player
 Valery Zazdravnykh (born 1963), Russian coach and footballer